Jason Austin Wiles (born April 25, 1970) is an American actor known for his role in the NBC procedural drama series Third Watch from 1999 to 2005.

Early life
Wiles was born in Kansas City, Missouri, U.S., and raised in Lenexa, Kansas, where he attended Holy Trinity Catholic School. After school he found employment with the local Parks and Recreation department, having passed up the opportunity to play college football.

Career
In 1990, Wiles began to pursue an interest in film-making, working on the set of the film Mr. and Mrs. Bridge, filming on location in Kansas City. Not long after, the Stephen King tele-movie, Sometimes They Come Back, came to town and he worked on the crew as well as appearing in scenes as an extra. After forming some connections while working on these films, Wiles ventured to Los Angeles where he appeared in commercials before landing the lead in an after-school special. In 1994, he had a part in the Bon Jovi music video "Always". 1994 also gave him his first lead role, in the indie movie WindRunner, appearing with Margot Kidder and Russell Means. In 1995, Wiles made the first of 32 appearances in Beverly Hills, 90210 as Colin Robbins, a role which gained him some note in Hollywood. In 1999, Wiles garnered the role of Maurice 'Bosco' Boscorelli in the television drama Third Watch; he appeared in all six seasons of the show from 1999-2005.

Wiles expanded into directing and writing, as well as theatre. In the summer of 2002, he appeared in the Cape Playhouse production of Mass Appeal alongside Malachy McCourt, and in 2003 he was in Imua! Theatre Company's production of Safe which was co-written and directed by fellow Third Watch star Anthony Ruivivar. Upon completion of the final season of Third Watch, Wiles began work on his independent film Lenexa, 1 Mile (2006) which he wrote and also directed. Wiles appeared alongside Geena Davis and Donald Sutherland in the TV series Commander in Chief. He played a soldier in the series Army Wives, appearing in two episodes. He directed, produced and wrote a 2009 movie, Play Dead. He had a small part in the 2007 movie Zodiac. He appeared in 2009's horror thriller remake of The Stepfather. In the summer of 2010, he co-starred in the NBC drama-suspense miniseries, Persons Unknown.

Wiles appeared twice in the TV series Criminal Minds as a guest. He appears in "Psychodrama" (S2E4) as a bank robber, and in "The Fight" (S5E18) as a father who is held captive along with his daughter.

Wiles appeared in the Law & Order: Special Victims Unit episode "Branded" on October 20, 2010 as serial rapist Alexander Gammon.

In 2015, Wiles was part of the main cast for the MTV series Scream in the role of Sheriff Clark Hudson.

Filmography

Film

Television

References

External links

1970 births
Living people
Male actors from Kansas City, Missouri
American male film actors
American male television actors
People from Lenexa, Kansas